The Silliman University School of Basic Education, abbreviated as SBE, is one of the academic units of Silliman University, a private university in Dumaguete, Philippines.

Academic profile

History

Composed of the early childhood, elementary and the high school departments, its origins can be traced to as early as 1901 when Silliman Institute was founded as an elementary school for boys by American Presbyterian missionaries. In 1916, the first high school diplomas were awarded and way into the 1950s an early childhood school was developed.  Over the years, these schools operated as separate units, but in 2001 a merger was made to form the present-day School of Basic Education.

Programs
Early childhood
Elementary school
High school

Student publications
Stones and Pebbles
Junior Sillimanian

Footnotes

External links
Silliman University official website

Basic Education
Laboratory schools in the Philippines
University-affiliated schools in the Philippines